Boundary County is the northernmost county of the U.S. state of Idaho. As of the 2020 census, the population was 12,056. The county seat and largest city is Bonners Ferry.

Boundary County was created by the Idaho Legislature on January 23, 1915. It is so named because it borders Canada, and is therefore the only county in Idaho with an international border. It is also only one of three counties in the United States that borders two states and a foreign country, the others being Coös County, New Hampshire and Erie County, Pennsylvania.

History
Boundary County was formed on January 23, 1915, from Bonner County. It was named Boundary County because it lies on the border of Canada, Washington and Montana.

Boundary County has seven election precincts: Bonners Ferry, Copeland, Kootenai, Moyie, Naples, North Bonners Ferry, and Valley View. All contain part of Bonners Ferry City except Copeland, Moyie, and Naples precincts.  Moyie Springs was incorporated in 1947.

Settlement of the area started with the establishment of Bonners Ferry on the Kootenai River in 1864. Settlement was limited to the ferry operation until about 1890. The town of Bonners Ferry was established in 1893.  At that point settlement was still sparse with small ranching and mining operations, but an expanding timber economy.  By 1900, other areas started to develop with the Boulder (now Kootenai), Boundary (now Copeland), and Naples precincts first listed in the U.S. Census of that year. The Moyie precinct first appeared in the 1910 census.

In 1980, convicted spy Christopher John Boyce found refuge in Boundary County, for a few months, after his escape from the Lompoc Federal Correctional Complex.  He stayed at the home of Gloria Ann White.  Boyce sustained himself during his stay with a series of bank robberies in the surrounding area, allegedly with technical assistance from White.

In 1992, Boundary County was the scene of the infamous Ruby Ridge siege by 350–400 armed federal agents against Randy Weaver and his family.

Geography

Adjacent counties
Lincoln County, Montana – east/Mountain Time Border
Bonner County – south
Pend Oreille County, Washington – west
Regional District of Central Kootenay, British Columbia – north

National protected areas
 Pacific Northwest National Scenic Trail (part)
 Kaniksu National Forest (part)
 Kootenai National Forest (part)
 Kootenai National Wildlife Refuge

Transportation

Highways
 US 2
 US 95
 SH-1

Airports
Boundary County Airport is a county-owned, public-use airport located two nautical miles (3.7 km) northeast of the central business district of Bonners Ferry.

Demographics

2000 census
As of the census of 2000, there were 9,871 people, 3,707 households, and 2,698 families living in the county.  The population density was 8 people per square mile (3/km2).  There were 4,095 housing units at an average density of 3 per square mile (1/km2).  The racial makeup of the county was 95.24% White, 0.16% Black or African American, 2.02% Native American, 0.58% Asian, 0.07% Pacific Islander, 0.86% from other races, and 1.07% from two or more races.  3.39% of the population were Hispanic or Latino of any race. 21.4% were of German, 12.9% American, 12.7% English, 9.9% Irish and 6.4% Norwegian ancestry.

There were 3,707 households, out of which 34.10% had children under the age of 18 living with them, 61.40% were married couples living together, 7.50% had a female householder with no husband present, and 27.20% were non-families. 23.10% of all households were made up of individuals, and 8.50% had someone living alone who was 65 years of age or older.  The average household size was 2.61 and the average family size was 3.07.

In the county, the population was spread out, with 29.20% under the age of 18, 6.90% from 18 to 24, 24.40% from 25 to 44, 26.20% from 45 to 64, and 13.40% who were 65 years of age or older.  The median age was 38 years. For every 100 females there were 101.40 males.  For every 100 females age 18 and over, there were 100.60 males.

The median income for a household in the county was $31,250, and the median income for a family was $36,440. Males had a median income of $31,209 versus $18,682 for females. The per capita income for the county was $14,636.  About 11.50% of families and 20% of the population were below the poverty line, including 19.50% of those under age 18 and 11.40% of those age 65 or over.

2010 census
As of the 2010 United States Census, there were 10,972 people, 4,421 households, and 2,976 families living in the county. The racial makeup of the county was 94.8% white, 1.7% American Indian, 0.6% Asian, 0.3% black or African American, 0.1% Pacific islander, 0.5% from other races, and 2.1% from two or more races. Those of Hispanic or Latino origin made up 3.7% of the population. In terms of ancestry, 22.5% were German, 12.8% were English, 11.2% were Irish, 7.4% were American, 5.9% were Norwegian, 5.4% were Dutch, and 5.1% were Scottish.

Of the 4,421 households, 29.7% had children under the age of 18 living with them, 55.0% were married couples living together, 7.6% had a female householder with no husband present, 32.7% were non-families, and 27.5% of all households were made up of individuals. The average household size was 2.47 and the average family size was 3.00. The median age was 42.8 years.

The median income for a household in the county was $37,712 and the median income for a family was $43,562. Males had a median income of $36,125 versus $26,076 for females. The per capita income for the county was $18,011. About 15.7% of families and 18.8% of the population were below the poverty line, including 22.0% of those under age 18 and 13.4% of those age 65 or over.

Politics
Like most of Idaho, Boundary County is solidly Republican. The last Democratic presidential candidate to carry the county was Lyndon B. Johnson in 1964.

Media

Television
A local translator district provides broadcast television stations from Spokane, WA.

Radio
KBFI, 1450 AM -
Bonners Ferry has been home to KBFI AM 1450 since 1983. It is owned by local licensee Radio Bonners Ferry, Inc, owned by Blue Sky Broadcasting, Inc. While licensed to Bonner's Ferry and its transmitter site is there, KBFI shares studios and offices with its sister stations (KSPT, KIBR, and KPND), at 327 Marion Avenue in Sandpoint, Idaho.

KQFR, 90.7 FM - 
On September 7, 2022, FM radio air-waves over Bonners Ferry came alive with the sounds of KQFR, 90.7 FM, a full-time (24/7) Christian Family Radio station. Affiliated with "Cornerstone Christian School," KQFR transmits from atop Black Mountain. Programming includes traditional gospel music, childrens' story hours, health messages, as well as good news of the soon return of Jesus Christ. Licensed in Moyie Springs, KQFR has been heard North of Creston, BC, South to Hayden, ID, East into Troy, MT, and West to Post Falls, ID.

Newspapers
Bonners Ferry is served by a single newspaper and several online news outlets.
The weekly Bonners Ferry Herald, owned by Hagadone Publishing is the official paper of record.

Communities

Cities
Bonners Ferry
Moyie Springs

Unincorporated communities
Copeland
Eastport
Good Grief
Naples
Porthill
Curley Creek

See also
 National Register of Historic Places listings in Boundary County, Idaho

References

External links
Boundary County website
Bonners Ferry
Boundary County Airport
Live Webcamera in Boundary County
KootenaiValleyTimes.com 

 

 
1915 establishments in Idaho
Idaho counties
Populated places established in 1915